João Pedro Gonçalves Almeida (born 5 August 1998 in Caldas da Rainha) is a Portuguese cyclist who currently rides for UCI WorldTeam .

Career
In 2019 Almeida, riding for  signed a 2-year contract with World Tour team .

Deceuninck–Quick-Step (2020-2021)

2020
During 2020, after a 2nd place in Giro dell'Emilia, he was named in the startlist for the 2020 Giro d'Italia, his first ever Grand Tour race. Almeida wore the Giro's leaders jersey for 15 consecutive days, from stage 4 to stage 18, the most ever by an under-23 rider. He went on to eventually finish 4th overall, the highest placing by a Portuguese rider.

2021
After some top-10 finishes on winter and early spring stage races, and set to leave  by the end of the year, he was again featured in the startlist for the 2021 Giro d'Italia, with no clear leadership between him and Remco Evenepoel. After supporting Remco in the first 2 weeks, Almeida ended up doing 5 top-10 finishes in the last 6 stages, ending up in 6th place Overall.

In June, Almeida became Portuguese Time Trial Champion as an Elite rider. Afterwards he participated in UEC European Road Championships and the  Olympics.

In August 2021, Almeida signed a 5-year contract with UAE Team Emirates starting on 2022. Shortly after, Almeida managed to get his two first places general classification, in Tour de Pologne and 2021 Tour de Luxembourg, winning 3 stages and scoring both youth rider's  classification and the points classification on the latter.

In the Autumn, Almeida debuted in the Elite's World Championships road race, and finished 2nd in Giro dell'Emilia, losing to Roglič, and 3rd in Milano–Torino.

UAE Team Emirates (2022–)

Major results

2015
 2nd Time trial, National Junior Road Championships
2016
 National Junior Road Championships
1st  Road race
1st  Time trial
2017
 3rd Time trial, National Under-23 Road Championships
 4th Overall Toscana-Terra di Ciclismo
1st Stage 2
 4th Overall Tour of Ankara
 8th Overall Tour of Mersin
1st Stage 3
 9th Overall Tour of Ukraine
1st  Young rider classification
1st Stage 4
2018
 1st Liège–Bastogne–Liège Espoirs
 National Under-23 Road Championships
2nd Road race
2nd Time trial
 2nd Overall Giro Ciclistico d'Italia
1st  Young rider classification
 5th Overall Ronde de l'Isard
1st  Young rider classification
 7th Overall Tour de l'Avenir
2019
 National Under-23 Road Championships
1st  Road race
1st  Time trial
 4th Overall Tour of Utah
1st  Young rider classification
2020
 2nd Giro dell'Emilia
 3rd Overall Settimana Internazionale di Coppi e Bartali
1st Stage 1b (TTT)
 3rd Overall Vuelta a Burgos
 4th Overall Giro d'Italia
Held  &  after Stages 3–17
 7th Overall Tour de l'Ain
1st  Young rider classification
 9th Overall Volta ao Algarve
2021
 1st  Time trial, National Road Championships
 1st  Overall Tour de Pologne
1st  Sprints classification
1st Stages 2 & 4
 1st  Overall Tour de Luxembourg
1st  Points classification
1st  Young rider classification
1st Stage 1
 2nd Giro dell'Emilia
 3rd Overall UAE Tour
 3rd Milano–Torino
 6th Overall Giro d'Italia
 6th Overall Tirreno–Adriatico
 7th Overall Volta a Catalunya
1st  Young rider classification
 10th Time trial, UEC European Road Championships
2022
 National Road Championships
1st  Road race
3rd Time trial
 2nd Overall Vuelta a Burgos
1st Stage 5
 3rd Overall Volta a Catalunya
1st Stage 4
 5th Overall Vuelta a España
 5th Overall UAE Tour
 8th Overall Paris–Nice
1st  Young rider classification
 Giro d'Italia
Held  after Stages 14–17
2023
 2nd Overall Tirreno–Adriatico
1st  Young rider classification
 6th Overall Volta ao Algarve
 9th Trofeo Serra de Tramuntana

General classification results timeline

Major championships results timeline

References

External links

1998 births
Living people
People from Caldas da Rainha
Portuguese male cyclists
Olympic cyclists of Portugal
Cyclists at the 2020 Summer Olympics
Sportspeople from Leiria District
20th-century Portuguese people
21st-century Portuguese people